Førslevgaard is a manor house and estate located close to Fuglebjerg, Næstved Municipality, approximately 90 kilometres southwest of Copenhagen, Denmark. It has since 1803 been owned by members of the de Neergaard family. The three-winged, Baroque-style main building was built for Carl Adolph von Plessen in 1726. It was listed on the Danish registry of protected buildings and places in 1827.

Nearby Førslev Church belonged to Gørslevgaard from 1544 to 1914. A number of former owners from the influential Beck family, who owned the manor from 1495 to 1659, are buried in the church.

History

Early history
Førslevgaard takes its name after the village of Førslev where it was located. It is first mentioned in 1347 when it was acquired by Jep Andersen Halvegge. He was succeeded by his son, Evert Jepsen Halvegge, whose daughter and only heir married Peder Mogensen.

Beck family
 
Peder Mogensen's daughter, Margrethe, brought Gørslevgaard into her marriage with Lasse Beck. Their son, Joachim Beck. expanded the estate with more land and tenant farms. In 1544, the estate was granted the status of birk. 

 
Førslevgaard and Beldringe were after Joachim Beck's death passed to his son Lauge Beck. His other holdings included Haverelykke on Lolland]], Olstrup on Zealand and the royal fiefs of Roskildegaard and Ringsted Abbey. Upon his death, Gørslevgaard was passed to his son Sivert Beck.

Changing owners
Gørslevgaard passed out of the family when Lauge Beck's widow, Margrethe Grubbe, married Steen Hohendorff and he bought out Beck's other heirs.

Hohendorffs sold Førslevgaard to Hans Bøfke in 1685. He placed more land  directly under the manor by dissolving five tenant fames. The estate then changed hands several times over the next centuries. None of the owners lived on the estate and the buildings gradually fell into neglect.

The Plessen family
 
In 1723, Førslevgaard was acquired by Carl Adolph von Plessen. He constructed a new main building, purchased more land and dissolved the remaining eight tenant farms in the village of Førslev. 

Carl Adolph von Plessen was the owner of seven estates at the time of his death. He had never marriage and therefore established a fideikommis under the name "De Plessiske Fidei-Commis-Godser" and left it to his brother's sons and their sons. A dispute arose over the distribution of the inheritance and a final settlement was not reached until 1778. The result was that Førslevgaard, Fuglebjergggard and Fodbygaard went to Christian Frederik von Plessen. His mother was entitled to three rooms at Førslevgaard as well as a pension for her maintenance. In 1789, he ceded Hørslevgaard and the other estates to his brother, Carl Adolph. He commenced the implementation of the agricultural reform programme  of the time, for instance by discontinuing corvée (Danish: Hoveri) on his estates and by granting the copyholders a right to pass their farms on to their children (Spanish: Arvefæste).

The de Neergaard family
In 1802, Det Plessenske Fideicommis was converted into capital. This enabled Carl Adolph von Plessen to sell Førslevgaard to Peter Johansen Neergaard the following year. Neergaard was one of the largest Danish landowners of his time. His many estates were divided between his many sons. In 1830, he passed Gørslevgaard and Guglebjerggaard to his third-eldest son Peter Johansen de Neergaard (1803-1872). In 1842, he increased his holdings by also acquiring Faarevejle on Langeland. In 1730, he had also acquired Mejlgaard but he sold it again in 1845.

Peter Johansen de Neergaard (1803-1872) left Førslevgaard and Fuglebjerg to his son Jakob Edvard de Neergaard (1855-1925). He never married and died without offspring. He left Førslevgaard and Guflebjerg to his nephew Wenzel Rudolf Flach de Neergaard (1892-1968). He was the son of Holger Flach de Neergaard (1868-1958) nd Louise von Hedemann (1865-1937). His eldest son Johan Wenzel Flach de Neergaard (1921-2006) became a co-owner of Førslevgaard in 1947 and its sold owner in 1964. His younger brother Holger Flach de Neergaard (1822-) received Fuglebjerggaard. Om 109+. Gørslevgaard was passed to Neergaard's son Johan Nicolaj Flach de Neergaard.

Today
The current owner is Johan Nicolaj Flach de Neergaard.

List of owners
 ( -1374) Hælenborg Olufsdatter Bille 
 (1374-1408) Jep Andersen Halvegge 
 (1408-1442) Evert Jepsen Halvegge 
 (1442-1495) Peder Mogensen Ravensberg 
 (1495-1501) Lasse Beck 
 (1501- ) Margrethe Ravensberg, gift Beck 
 (1501-1572) Joachim Beck 
 (1572-1607) Lauge Beck 
 (1607-1623) Sivert Beck 
 (1623-1648) Steen Beck 
 (1623-1659) Lauge Beck
 (1659-1661) Margrethe Grubbe, gift 1) Beck, 2) Hohendorff 
 (1661-1685) Steen Hohendorff 
 (1685-1705) Hans von Bøfke 
 (1705-1706) Peter Rodsteen 
 (1706-1709) Hector Gottfried Masius 
 (1709-1721) Arvinger efter Hector Gottfried Masius
 (1721-1723) Frederik von der Maase 
 (1723-1758) Carl Adolph von Plessen 
 (1758-1763) Frederik Christian von Plessen 
 (1763-1789) Christian Frederik von Plessen 
 (1789-1803) Carl Adolph von Plessen 
 (1803-1830) Peter Johansen Neergaard
 (1830-1872) Peter Johansen de Neergaard 
 (1872-1895) Peter Johansen de Neergaard 
 (1895-1925) Jakob Edvard de Neergaard 
 (1925-1964) Wenzel Rudolf Flach de Neergaard 
 (1947-1980) Johan Wenzel Flach de Neergaard 
 (1980- ) Johan Nicolaj Flach de Neergaard

References 

Listed buildings and structures in Næstved Municipality
Manor houses in Næstved Municipality
Listed castles and manor houses in Denmark
Buildings and structures associated with the Neergaard family
Houses completed in 1726